The Economic League (Dutch: Economische Bond, EB) was a liberal political party in the Netherlands from 1917 to 1921.

Party History
The EB was founded on 15 December 1917 by Willem Treub, a former Minister of Finance. He was a political independent, although he had been member of the progressive liberal Freethinking Democratic League (VDB) until 1913. He was a very successful minister and popular politician, especially in business and middle class circles. He was known as "Minister Forward". He advocated pragmatic politics implemented by strong independent politicians drawn from business. Treub's personalized campaign was supported by successful businessmen. In the 1918 elections the party won only three seats. After the elections the League joined the newly formed neutral parliamentary party, which united several one and two-person parties, namely the Economic League, the Neutral Party, the Peasants' League, the Middle Class Party and the Alliance for Democratization of the Army. The parliamentary party was led by Treub. In parliament Treub was unable retain his popularity, in the 1919 municipal elections the party lost half its votes and won no seats. In the same year Treub, who realized his party had failed, initiated the formation of a liberal party, which would unite all liberal parties. In 1921 the Economic League merged into the Liberal State Party, together with the Liberal Union, League of Free Liberals, Neutral Party and the Middle Class Party. Treub left politics, and the influence of the League on this new party was rather limited.

Ideology & Issues
The EB was a pragmatic liberal party which sought to replace ideological, partisan politics with pragmatic solutions for the common man. It had a liberal agenda, advocating a free market, with strong business and a limited, but efficient government. It sought to limit the power of parliament, while strengthening that of the cabinet.

Leadership & Support
This table show the EB's results in elections to the House of Representatives and Senate, as well as the party's political leadership: the fractievoorzitter, is the chair of the parliamentary party and the lijsttrekker is the party's top candidate in the general election, these posts are normally taken by the party's leader.

Electorate
The party drew most its support from voters who were not aligned with any of the major pillars. It drew most of its support from middle-class neighbourhoods in The Hague, Arnhem and the Gooi region, the region around Hilversum.

References

Defunct political parties in the Netherlands
Liberal parties in the Netherlands
Netherlands 1917
Political parties established in 1917
Political parties disestablished in 1921
1917 establishments in the Netherlands